Maria of Yugoslavia (born Princess Maria of Romania; 6 January 1900 – 22 June 1961), known in Serbian as Marija Karađorđević, was Queen of the Serbs, Croats and Slovenes, later Queen of Yugoslavia, as the wife of King Alexander from 1922 until his assassination in 1934. She was the mother of Peter II, the last reigning Yugoslav monarch. Her citizenship was revoked, and her property was confiscated by the Yugoslav communist regime in 1947, but she was "rehabilitated" in 2014.

Early life
Maria was born on 6 January 1900, at Friedenstein Palace in Gotha, a town in Thuringia, in the German Empire. She was named after her maternal grandmother, Grand Duchess Maria Alexandrovna of Russia, and was known as Mignon in the family to distinguish her from her mother. Her parents were Princess Marie of Saxe-Coburg-Gotha and Prince Ferdinand of Hohenzollern-Sigmaringen. 

In 1914, after the death of Carol I, her parents became King and Queen of Romania, and Maria moved with them to Romania, which became her new home country. During World War I, she worked as a nurse with her mother, along with her two sisters. Although plump, Maria was a noted beauty in her youth and resembled her sister Elisabeth. 

The family spent their vacations at Peleș Castle near Sinaia. In 1922, the future Alexander I of Yugoslavia was invited to Peleș Castle, and introduced to Maria. Maria and Alexander fell in love, and were engaged with the support of Maria's father Ferdinand I.

Queen
Maria married Alexander I, second King of Serbs, Croats and Slovenes, in Belgrade on 8 June 1922. The wedding took place at the Saint Michael's cathedral. The wedding was given big international publicity at the time. Since Maria was related to the British Royal House, the British Crown was represented by the Duke of York, who attended the wedding as witness. 

On 3 October 1929, Maria became Queen of Yugoslavia when Alexander changed the name of the country. The royal couple settled at the Karađorđević estate in Oplenac near Topola. Since the new Royal Residence in Belgrade was not finished, the king and queen continued to live at the Karađorđević estate. Queen Maria established good relations with the Orthodox clergy and engaged in charity. At the Karađorđević estate, Maria participated in the work of the local peasantry at the royal estate, and could be seen working in the field dressed in traditional folk costume. She founded schools for the children of the local farmers, scholarships for the benefit of poor students and co-operated with the church to help poor families. Her first son was given a traditional royal Serbian name, her second son was given a Croatian name and her third son  was given a Slovenian name to create unity in the new state of Yugoslavia. Her children played with the children of the workers on the estate. The simple life of Maria gave her a great deal of favourable publicity, and her popularity also benefitted Alexander, when she and sometimes the children accompanied him on his trips around Yugoslavia. 

Maria was well educated. She spoke several languages fluently and enjoyed painting and sculpting under the guidance of artist Iva Despić-Simonović. She also drove a car by herself, which was very unusual for royalty at the time.

Following the assassination of her husband, King Alexander I, in Marseille in 1934, her oldest son, aged only 11, became Peter II of Yugoslavia and was the last reigning Yugoslav king. Her son, being a minor, was placed under the regency of his uncle, Prince Paul. The regent gave Maria an allowance of six million dinars for herself and her children: she kept a quarter of the amount, and spend the rest on charity. Queen Maria initially kept participating in royal representation as a widow. Her first assignment as a widow was a campaign against tuberculosis.

After the death of Alexander, Maria suffered from a deteriorating state of rheumatism. In 1938, she bought a farm in Gransden in Bedfordshire north of London in England. In 1939, she moved permanently to her house in England: she took her younger children with her, but was obliged to leave her eldest son in Yugoslavia because of his position as monarch. It was rumoured at the time that Maria left Yugoslavia because of a conflict with the Prince Regent Paul, but the official reason stated for her move was her health. She was given the title Queen Mother of Yugoslavia in 1941.

Later life
Yugoslavia declared itself neutral at the outbreak of the World War II. On 25 March 1941 however Prince Paul declared Yugoslavia an ally of Nazi Germany and Fascist Italy. On 27 March Peter II deposed Prince Paul as regent. On 6 April, Nazi Germany attacked Yugoslavia, and Peter II fled to Britain, arriving in June. Maria suggested that she should return to Yugoslavia to stand by the Yugoslav people during the war, but was prevented by her health problems from doing so. 

During the war, Maria provided relief help for Yugoslav prisoners of war in Nazi custody through the Red Cross in Britain. To avoid being identified by the Germans as a sender, she gave the name of Mary Djordjevic as the sender of the packages, but she was identified by the Yugoslav prisoners.

On 29 November 1945, the monarchy was abolished in Yugoslavia. Her son Peter II settled in the United States. Maria herself bought a new farm in Kent, were she lived a simple life with her two younger sons, often seen working in the fields. She chose not to use her contacts as a member of the British royal family. She engaged in the Yugoslav community in London, as well as her interest in art, and studied at the Byam Shaw School of Art and participated in several exhibitions with her art work. 

She died at her home in exile in Chelsea, London on 22 June 1961, aged 61.  Her funeral was held on 2 July 1961 at the Serbian Orthodox Church, Notting Hill, London and was initially interred at the Royal Burial Ground at Frogmore, which adjoins Windsor Castle. Her remains were transferred to Serbia in April 2013 and re-interred on 26 May 2013 in Oplenac, Serbia.

Family

Maria and Alexander I had three children:
King Peter II (1923–1970) ∞ Princess Alexandra of Greece and Denmark
Prince Tomislav (1928–2000) ∞ Princess Margarita of Baden ∞ Linda Mary Bonney Van Dyke
Prince Andrej (1929–1990) ∞ Princess Christina Margarethe of Hesse ∞ Princess Kira Melita of Leiningen ∞ Eva Marija Andjelkovich

Honours
 : Dame Grand Cross of the Order of Carol I
 : Dame Grand Cross of the Order of the Crown of Romania
 : Dame Grand Cross of the Order of the Star of Karađorđe (8 June 1922)
 : Dame Grand Cross of the Order of the Yugoslav Crown
 : Dame Grand Cross of the Legion of Honour (1959)
 : Dame Grand Cross of the Order of St. Alexander, in Diamonds (1934)
 : Grand Cross of the Order of the White Lion (4 April 1937)

Gallery

Sources

 Danica e Srđan Čolović, Marija Karađorđević - Kraljica majka, Arhiv Srbije, Belgrado 2001, ISBN 86-81511-16-5

External links
 Royal House of Yugoslavia
 The Mausoleum of the Serbian Royal Family

|-

|-

1900 births
1961 deaths
People from Gotha (town)
Romanian princesses
Queen mothers
Yugoslav queens consort
Karađorđević dynasty
Princesses of Hohenzollern-Sigmaringen
Members of the Romanian Orthodox Church
Burials at the Mausoleum of the Royal House of Karađorđević, Oplenac
Royal reburials
Grand Crosses of the Order of the Crown (Romania)
Grand Crosses of the Order of the White Lion
Daughters of kings